

Cape Hotham Light is an active lighthouse in the Northern Territory of Australia located on Cape Hotham on the coastline of the Van Diemen Gulf  about  northeast of the territory capital of Darwin,  The lighthouse marks the entrance to Clarence Strait, the eastern approach to Darwin.

The lighthouse was constructed by the Commonwealth Lighthouse Service during the "Golden Age of Australian Lighthouses", between 1913 and 1920.

The light characteristic shown is three flashes, one every two seconds, repeating every 15 seconds (Fl.(3)W.R. 15s). The color is red on 025°-070° and white elsewhere.

The site is accessible by boat from Darwin, but the tower is closed to the public. The light is operated by the Australian Maritime Safety Authority.

Cape Hotham 
Cape Hotham was named by John Clements Wickham on 26 July 1839, honoring Admiral William Hotham, 1st Baron Hotham. It is listed in the Register of the National Estate as the "Cape Hotham Forest Reserve", listing "representative ecosystems of the Top End, including monsoon rainforest containing kentia palm (Gronophyllum ramsayi)".

See also 

 List of lighthouses in Australia

Notes

References 

 
 
 
  reprinted in

External links 
 
 

Lighthouses completed in the 20th century
Lighthouses in the Northern Territory